Syalakhadi  is a village development committee in Western Rukum District in Karnali Province of western Nepal. At the time of the 2011 Nepal census it had a population of 4695 people living in 852 individual households. There is a lake in Pahada village. There are various types of houses near the lake. The lake in Pahada is also called Kanda Daha. The lake is surrounded by a variety of plants, including sallo.

References

Populated places in Western Rukum District